Dancehall Queen is a 1997 Jamaican film.

Dancehall Queen may also refer to:
 "Dancehall Queen", a song by Beenie Man in the film
 "Dancehall Queen" (Robyn song), a 2010 song by Robyn
 Dancehall Queens, female celebrities in the dancehall music genre

See also 
 Lady Saw (born 1968), Jamaican reggae singer known as the queen of dancehall